David Altshuler may refer to:
 David Altshuler (physician), American clinical endocrinologist and human geneticist
 David Altshuler (curator), American scholar and museum director